Jaroslav Erno Šedivý (born Jaroslav Šedivý on 15 October 1947, Prague, Czechoslovakia) is a Czech rock drummer. He was member of The Primitives Group, thereafter Flamengo (Kuře v hodinkách) and also Energit (briefly in 1973). In 1973 he emigrated to the United States, where he worked with a most groups including Jello Biafra's backing band and Invisible Pedestrian. Between 1974-1979 he lived in various towns in California and between 1979-1980 in New York. In 1990s he was member of Life After Life with another Czech emigrant Jim Čert. From 2009 he was member of 2zzex.

References

External links
2zzex

Czech musicians
Czech drummers
Male drummers
1947 births
Living people
Energit (band) members